Yandex.Checkout (works as Яндекс.Касса in Russia and Yandex.支付 in China) is a Russian online payment system operated by Yandex.Money, a joint venture of Russian technology corporation Yandex and the largest bank in Russia Sberbank. Yandex.Checkout was launched in late 2013. Yandex.Checkout has been the most popular payment application in Russia since 2015. By the end of 2018, the service was used by over 106,000 websites around the globe, including major online retailers and government services portals, totaling for over 31% of online payment processing market in Russia by 2018.

History 

Yandex.Checkout was launched for Russian customers in October 2013. By the end of 2014, the share of Yandex.Checkout in the Russian market of online payments reached 18%.

In autumn 2016 Yandex.Checkout added support for Russia's national payment system Mir. Since January 2017 the service has become a payment operator of ‘1C: Enterprise management automation system’ by 1C Company. A year later, in February 2018, the ‘1C’ company added the Yandex.Checkout payment module to the ‘1C: Enterprise’ standard electronic document library, which made it easier for 1.5 million commercial and budget organizations to receive payments and invoices via Yandex.Checkout.

In June 2017 Yandex.Checkout announced integrations with online cash registers (CRE) in accordance with Federal Law No. 54-FZ  "On the Application of Cash Register Equipment in Settlements in Cash and/or via Electronic Means of Payment" that enforced more severe rules on CRE use information exchange with Federal Tax Service.

In 2018 Yandex.Checkout introduced support for Sberbank. Online payments and instant processing for payments between Sberbank business customers. The b2b service makes it easier to receive payments from the legal entities and speed up their processing.

In 2015—2018 Yandex.Checkout increased its market share from 24% to over 31% in Russia.

In 2014 Yandex.Checkout started partnering with Chinese marketplaces and online stores. As of November 2017 Adyen expanded its partnership with Yandex.Checkout to enable retailers worldwide to accept most popular payments methods in Russia and the CIS.

In 2018 Yandex.Checkout introduced an application for South Korean online merchants. As of November 2018 Yandex.Checkout launched WeChat Pay payments for both online and offline businesses – it is being used by an increasing number of Chinese citizens. Yandex.Checkout is also widely used to accept payments from customers in Russia and abroad by international companies such as AliExpress, JD.com, Joom, Umkamall, Gearbest, TradeEase, BlaBlaCar, Renault, iTunes, Skype, Nintendo, Riot Games, Wargaming, Blizzard and others.

In 2019, the magazine "Banking Review" called this project "the best payment service in 2018". Yandex.Checkout was recognized as "the Best PSP" at Merchant Payments Ecosystem (MPE) Conference 2019 in Berlin.

Features 

Yandex.Checkout allows individual entrepreneurs, businesses and nonprofit organizations to receive payments in many ways: from bank cards, through Yandex.Money and other e-wallets, through mobile applications and Internet banking of Sberbank, Alfa-Bank, Promsvyazbank and Tinkoff Bank, cell phone accounts, using contactless technologies Apple Pay, Google Pay and WeChat Pay, as well as cash through 250 thousand payment acceptance points in Russia and other countries. As a term of an additional agreement, it is possible to receive payments from cards of American Express, JCB and Diners Club cards. The service has a number of specific options:

 Invoicing by SMS, e-mail, in chats and messengers. Such receipts can be paid for by all means available in Yandex.Checkout.
 Recurring payments: Yandex.Checkout can charge automatically at a specified time (autopayments).
 Safe storage of card details, authorization hold and mass payouts.
 So-called Safe Deal feature for C2C marketplaces to reserve payments until goods or services are provided (since February 2016) 
 Apple Pay, Google Pay (since June 2018), WeChat Pay support (since November 2018), and Garmin Pay (since December 2018) 
 Installments and credit payments support (since March 2018) 
 Payment forms integrated in live chat support applications, emails and messaging apps such as Telegram and Viber
 An API and mSDK for custom website and mobile application integrations and analytics 
 Support for more than 70 cash registers form 9 Russian vendors in accordance with Federal Law No. 54-FZ and payment solution for purchases in Telegram messaging app
 An integrated deep learning-based anti-fraud system that's also available as a separate service for users that don't use Yandex.Checkout
 A built-in marketplace for business services such as website design, CRM integration, accounting, legal services etc.

Integrations 

Yandex.Checkout supports integrations with popular content management systems, customer-relationship management systems and billing applications such as 1C-Bitrix, OpenCart, InSales, BILLmanager, RetailCRM and others. It can create QR invoices and generate payment forms that can be sent via email, chat or messenger apps.

References 

Payment service providers
Yandex